Kharman Sukhteh may refer to:

Kharman Sukhteh, Kerman
Kharman Sukhteh, Qazvin